Mohammad Esmaeil Nabibakhsh also known as Moein Nabibakhsh is an Iranian professional Kabaddi player who currently plays as an all rounder for Punneri Paltan in the Pro Kabaddi League and represents Iran national kabaddi team in the international circuit. He was the part of Iran national kabaddi team that won gold in the 2018 Asian Games.

Early life
He was born and brought up in Mazandaran Province. Having gained popularity at the local level, he made his way into the Iran National Kabaddi Team. Currently he is pursuing a bachelor's degree in physical education in Shomal University.

Career
In 2019, he started his Vivo Pro Kabaddi League journey after being purchased by Bengal Warriors. He was the most expensive foreign buy of the season at ₹77.75 lakh. He made his debut against UP Yoddha and scored a super 10 in that match. He proved to be a valuable asset for his team as he continued to contributing points both in raids and defence. He is one of the few players in the PKL to register a super 10 and high five both. After the team captain Maninder Singh dislocated his shoulder and become injured in a match against Dabang Delhi. He took over the captaincy and led the team by example in the semi-final and final. And Bengal Warriors won their first ever PKL trophy.

Career statistics

References 

Iranian kabaddi players
Sportspeople from Mazandaran province
1991 births
Asian Games medalists in kabaddi
Kabaddi players at the 2018 Asian Games
Asian Games gold medalists for Iran
Medalists at the 2018 Asian Games
Living people
Pro Kabaddi League players